The Bristol Channel floods of 30 January 1607 drowned many people and destroyed a large amount of farmland and livestock during a flood in the Bristol Channel area of the UK. The known tide heights, probable weather, extent and depth of flooding, and coastal flooding elsewhere in the UK on the same day all point to the cause being a storm surge rather than a tsunami.

Description

On 30 January 1607, around noon, the coasts of the Bristol Channel suffered from unexpectedly high floodings that broke the coastal defences in several places. Low-lying places in Devon, Somerset, Gloucestershire, and South Wales were flooded. The devastation was particularly severe on the Welsh side, extending from Laugharne in Carmarthenshire to above Chepstow in Monmouthshire. Cardiff was the most badly affected town, with the foundations of St Mary's Church destroyed.

It is estimated that 2,000 or more people were drowned, houses and villages were swept away, an estimated  of farmland inundated, and livestock destroyed, wrecking the local economy along the coasts of the Bristol Channel and Severn Estuary.

The coast of Devon and the Somerset Levels as far inland as Glastonbury Tor,  from the coast, were also affected. The sea wall at Burnham-on-Sea gave way, and the water flowed over the low-lying levels and moors.

Thirty villages in Somerset were affected, including Brean which was "swallowed up" and where seven out of the nine houses were destroyed with 26 of the inhabitants dying. A chiselled mark remains showing that the maximum height of the water was 7.74 metres (25 feet 5 inches) above sea level.

Contemporary accounts of the flood were written by people such as the Puritan pamphleteer, William Jones:

Cause
The flooding is thought to have been caused by an exceptional tide combined with severe weather. This occurred in combination with a severe south-westerly gale with peak winds measured at Barnstaple from 3am to noon, and coastal flooding in East Anglia at night on the 30th, both of which are consistent with a storm tracking eastwards. It has been demonstrated that the tide and weather event that occurred on this date were capable of generating a surge consistent with the observed inundation.

Tsunami hypothesis
An earlier 2002 research paper, following investigations by Professor Simon Haslett of Bath Spa University and Australian geologist Ted Bryant of the University of Wollongong, suggested that the flooding may have been caused by a tsunami, after the authors had read some eyewitness accounts in the historical reports which described the flood. The British Geological Survey has suggested that, as there is no evidence of a landslide off the continental shelf, a tsunami would most likely have been caused by an earthquake on a known unstable fault off the coast of southwest Ireland, causing the vertical displacement of the sea floor. One contemporary report describes an earth tremor on the morning of the flood; however, other sources date this earthquake to a few months after the event.

However, because of high wave energy conditions it is not methodologically possible to distinguish between storm and tsunami boulder deposits on North Atlantic coasts.

In attributing the flood to a storm surge in their 2006 paper, Horsburgh and Horritt show that those proposing a tsunami hypothesis underestimate the volume of water and coastal damage involved in storm surges, and fail to account for flooding on the opposite side of the country on the same day. There is also a lack of evidence for the event affecting West Wales, Cornwall, or southern Ireland. Their tsunami modelling showed that it would not be possible for a tsunami not to affect these areas, while causing flooding elsewhere in the country. Contemporary sources also indicate the flooding proceeded for a period of five hours, which is consistent with a storm surge rather than a tsunami.

Future recurrence
While the risk of similar events in the foreseeable future is considered to be low, it is estimated that the potential cost caused by comparable flooding to residential, commercial, industrial, and agricultural property could range from £7 billion to £13 billion at 2007 insured values. There has also been concern that the nuclear power stations at Hinkley Point and Oldbury could be endangered.

Commemorations 
The plaque records the year as 1606 because, under the Julian calendar in use at that time, the new year did not start until Lady Day, 25 March. The resultant financial loss in the parish was estimated as £5,000 (equivalent to £ million in ).

The flood was commemorated in a contemporary pamphlet entitled God's warning to the people of England by the great overflowing of the waters or floods.

On the 400th anniversary, 30 January 2007, BBC Somerset looked at the possible causes and asked whether it could happen again in the county.

In 2006 "Flood 400", a church and community partnership, was set up to commemorate the Great Flood. A commemorative service was held, on the anniversary day in 2007, with the Bishop of Bath and Wells. A series of events took place, throughout the year, centred on the public buildings in the villages of Goldcliff, Nash and Redwick and included exhibitions, lectures, religious services, school visits, guided tours and walks. A festival weekend took place between 24 and 28 May 2007.

See also
 List of natural disasters in Great Britain and Ireland
 List of disasters in Great Britain and Ireland by death toll
 List of Deadliest Tsunamis
 Geology of Great Britain
 Tsunamis affecting the British Isles
 1999 Blayais Nuclear Power Plant flood

Notes

References

Other sources

External links
 "The Killer Wave of 1607" – BBC's Timewatch, 1 April 2005
 The great flood of 1607: could it happen again? (BBC Somerset)
 Anniversary of 1607 killer wave (BBC News)
 Mike Kohnstamm: Text of original sources and local pictures 

Floods in the United Kingdom
1607 natural disasters
1607 in England
Natural disasters in Wales
1607 in Wales
Water in Wales
Disasters in Somerset
Floods
17th-century floods
17th century in Somerset